Hoare is an English surname derived from Middle English hor(e) meaning grey- or white-haired. Notable people with the surname include:

 Albert Alfred Hoare, known as Bert Hoare (1874–1962), South Australian politician
 Des Hoare (born 1934), Australian cricketer
 Desmond Hoare (Royal Navy officer) (1910–1988), British sailor and educator
 Edward Hoare (disambiguation), several people
 Elizabeth Hoare (1915–2001), English church furnisher and actress
 Henry Hoare (banker) (1677–1725), English banker and land-owner
 Henry Hoare (1705–1785), English banker and garden owner-designer
 James Hoare (born 1943), British academic and historian
 Joe Hoare (1881–1947), English footballer
 John Gurney Hoare (1810–1875), English cricketer and banker
 Kelly Hoare (born 1963), Australian politician
 Louisa Gurney Hoare (1784–1836), English diarist and writer
 Mad Mike Hoare (1919–2020), Irish mercenary leader
 Marko Attila Hoare (born 1972), British historian
 Mary Hoare (1744–1820), English artist
 Peter Hoare (disambiguation), several people
 Prince Hoare (elder) (c.1711–1769), English sculptor
 Prince Hoare (younger) (1755–1834), English painter and dramatist
 Sir Richard Hoare (banker) (1648–1718), British goldsmith, banker and politician
 Sir Richard Hoare, 2nd Baronet (1758–1838), British antiquarian and archaeologist
 Sir Samuel Hoare, 1st Baronet (1841–1915), English politician
 Samuel Hoare, 1st Viscount Templewood (1880–1959), British politician
 Sarajane Hoare, British-born fashion journalist, stylist and magazine editor
 Seamus Hoare, Gaelic footballer
 Sean Hoare (1963–2011), British journalist
 Seán Hoare (born 1994), Irish professional footballer
 Simon Hoare (born 1969), British politician
 Sir Tony Hoare (born 1934), British computer scientist
 Wilfred Hoare (1909–2003), English cricketer and headmaster
 William Hoare (c.1707–1792), British painter

See also 
 Hoare baronets, four Baronetcies
 Hoare logic, named after its inventor, Tony Hoare

References 

English-language surnames